Sherzod Husanov (born 27 January 1980) is a boxer from Uzbekistan who won medals at the 2001 and 2003 World Amateur Boxing Championships and participated in the 2000 and 2004 Olympics.

Amateurs
In 2000 when Sydney hosted the 2000 Summer Games, he lost in his second bout, to eventual Bronze winner Vitalie Gruşac of Moldova.

At both the 2001 World Amateur Boxing Championships and the 2003 World Amateur Boxing Championships in Bangkok, he lost to winner Lorenzo Aragon winning bronze and the silver medal in the Welterweight division.

He qualified for the Athens Olympic Games by winning the silver medal at the 2004 Asian Amateur Boxing Championships in Puerto Princesa, Philippines. In the final he was defeated by South Korea's Kim Jung-Joo.
At the 2004 Summer Olympics he was beaten in the quarterfinals of the Welterweight (69 kg) division by Russia's two-time champion Oleg Saitov.

Pro
He turned pro at light middleweight at 2007 and won 17 bouts, one draw but showed little power. His draw was against another amateur star in Timur Nergadze whom he outpointed in the rematch.

See also
List of current WBC international champions

References

External links
 
 

1980 births
Living people
Uzbekistani male boxers
Olympic boxers of Uzbekistan
Boxers at the 2000 Summer Olympics
Boxers at the 2004 Summer Olympics
Asian Games medalists in boxing
Asian Games bronze medalists for Uzbekistan
Boxers at the 2002 Asian Games
Medalists at the 2002 Asian Games
AIBA World Boxing Championships medalists
Welterweight boxers
21st-century Uzbekistani people